The Machpelah Cemetery, also spelled as "Macpelah Cemetery", or "Macphelah Cemetery", is a cemetery in Hudson County, New Jersey.

Location

Machpelah Cemetery is located at 5810 Tonnelle Avenue, in North Bergen, New Jersey. The entrance is just north of the Tonnelle Avenue terminus of the Hudson Bergen Light Rail.

History

Name
Machpelah is a name given to numerous cemeteries in the United States. The Cave of the Patriarchs or the Cave of Machpelah (Hebrew: מערת המכפלה, Me'arat HaMachpela, Trans. "Doubled Cave") is a cave-within-a-cave located in Hebron, Israel, that Biblical tradition ascribes the status of the burial tomb for Abraham, Isaac, Jacob, and their wives.

Before the cemetery

Machpelah is contained within Lot No. 18 in then Maisland, which contained a celebrated and exotic garden, locally called the "Frenchman's Garden", since the well-known botanist André Michaux was commissioned by the King of France, Louis XVI in 1786 as a botanist with the ability to import any plant, tree or vegetable from France that was desired by the United States. It also featured a variety of plants collected from the United States, as well as plants from all over the world. The Lombardy poplar was originally stocked in the garden, and, introduced into commerce, eventually spread throughout the United States.

Use as a burial site
Located in the Bergenwood section of then New Durham, land at Machpelah Cemetery was first used for burial purposes in 1850. The cemetery was officially opened in 1853, by the Third Reformed Presbyterian Church Society of New York, and thus, was for many years strictly Protestant Cemetery. This is controversial and disputed by many. Other sources list it strictly as a Jewish burial site and claim the misinformation on Protestant ownership was due to the widespread anti semitism and attempt by the Protestant Church in New York to convert all Jews to Christianity. The Protestant missionary movement in the 1800s to convert "was reported regularly in  The New York Times newspaper.
In the Twenty Seventh edition of Appleton's Dictionary dated 1905, listed in alphabetical order just above the description of Madison Square Garden, it discusses Machpelah Cemetery being strictly a Jewish Cemetery. It makes no mention of a Protestant cemetery being in use on the same grounds or being shared. Rather Appleton's Dictionary explains it is a Jewish Cemetery in addition to a 2nd Jewish Cemetery of the same name in Queens New York. Because of the steep grade of the grounds and the eventual descent into the surrounding marshes in Secaucus, contamination of wells, springs, and water-courses in the surrounding area is very low.

A report from 1879 states that 2,500 graves lie in the cemetery, where the price of a grave annually was about $100, and in the next century it was reported to have over 18,000 bodies in it.

In 2022, Hudson County and volunteers embarked on program to restore gravestones of over 300 veterans buried at the cemetery.

See also
 Hudson County Cemeteries
 Fairview Cemetery

References

Sources

External links
 Aerial view of Hoboken, Machpelah, and Flower Hill at Graveinfo
 
 Civil War Gravestones at Machpelah at New Jersey Civil War Gravestones

North Bergen, New Jersey
Protestant Reformed cemeteries
Cemeteries in Hudson County, New Jersey
1850 establishments in New Jersey